Charles Joseph Wilson is an American film and theater actor.  In 2010, he received a Lucille Lortel nomination for his role as Michael, in  Lucinda Coxon’s  play Happy Now?. He was nominated again In 2016 for Outstanding Featured Actor in a Play for his role in Hold On to Me Darling.

Early life and education 
Born and raised in Fairhope, Alabama, Wilson became interested in acting while studying at Troy State University. He also attended the Juilliard School.

Career
He made his Broadway debut in the 2000 revival of Gore Vidal’s The Best Man. Other Broadway credits include A Steady Rain, Festen, Henry IV and Long Day’s Journey into Night. Off-Broadway, he appeared in All-American at LCT 3; The Bear at HERE; Offices and Voysey Inheritance at Atlantic Theater; Race at Jewish Rep; Stop Kiss, The Cripple of Inishmaan and The Merry Wives of Windsor at the Public Theater. He also appeared in nine episodes of the sixth season of the American television drama series Homeland.

Filmography

Film

Television

References

External links

Living people
Troy University alumni
Year of birth missing (living people)
Place of birth missing (living people)
American male actors
Juilliard School alumni
People from Fairhope, Alabama